Kim Ji-won (born December 21, 1995), known by his stage name Bobby is a South Korean rapper, singer-songwriter and member of iKon under 143 Entertainment. In 2016, he formed a sub-unit with Mino under the name MOBB. He is best known for finishing in first place on Mnet's survival show: Show Me The Money 3.

Early life 
Kim Ji-won was born on December 21, 1995, in Seoul, South Korea. In 2005, his family moved to Fairfax, Virginia, United States. There, he auditioned for YG Entertainment and later met Kim Jinwoo of Jinusean in New York. Bobby was officially recruited as a trainee under the label on January 10, 2011.

Career

2013–2014: Career beginnings and pre-debut activities
After over two years of training, Bobby participated in the 2013 survival show Win: Who Is Next? under Team B. He started using his stage name Bobby, named after his idol, Bob Marley. Because Team A won the program, Bobby continued training under YG Entertainment. In November 2013, while still a trainee, Bobby appeared in the music video for "Ringa Linga" by label-mate Taeyang of Big Bang alongside B.I and Jinhwan from Team B, Winner's Mino and Taehyun, and Blackpink's Lisa.

In May 2014, together with B.I, Bobby competed on Mnet's Show Me The Money 3. He finished in first place under Team Illionaire, mentored by Dok2 and The Quiett. Throughout the show, Bobby released the singles "Go", "L4L (Lookin' for Luv)", "YGGR#HipHop", and "Guard Up and Bounce". Following the show's conclusion, he participated in Mix & Match, where filming began in midst of appearance of Show Me The Money. The show resulted in the debut of Team B, alongside trainee Jung Chan-woo, under the group name iKon.

In October 2014, Bobby featured in Epik High's single "Born Hater" alongside Beenzino, Verbal Jint, B.I, and Mino, and in November 11, he featured in "I'm Different" by Hi Suhyun, a project unit composed of Lee Hi and Lee Su-hyun of Akdong Musician. In the same month, he also featured with Dok2 in Masta Wu's track "Come Here". He performed "Born Hater" with Epik High at the 2014 Mnet Asian Music Awards, also performing "Come Here" and his single "YGGR" together with Dok2, The Quiett and Masta Wu. He was featured on GQ Korea's 2014 Men of the Year list and on December 4, 2014, he appeared as a guest at GQ Party.

2015–present: Debuts of iKon and MOBB and solo endeavors

On September 15, 2015. iKon released the warm-up single "My Type", followed by lead singles "Rhythm Ta" and "Airplane". On October 4, the group attended their first music show, SBS' Inkigayo, receiving their third win for "My Type". The group released their debut album on December 24, 2015.

In March 2016, Bobby featured on Lee Hi's single "Video" from her studio album Seoulite. Bobby also made an appearance on the ninth episode of Show Me the Money 5, featuring in Reddy's song "Like This", which they performed onstage together.  In September 2016, Bobby released the single "Holup!" as part of a four-track extended play (EP), The MOBB, a collaboration between Bobby and Winner's Mino under the group name MOBB. They released the lead singles "Full House" and "Hit Me" on September 9 alongside the music videos.

In March 2017, Bobby and B.I featured in Psy's single "Bomb" from his studio album 4x2=8. Bobby released his first solo studio album, Love and Fall, on September 14, 2017, for which he served producer and participated in writing and composing for all songs on the album. Bandmate Donghyuk and Katie Kim featured on the track "Secret", and label-mate Mino featured in the track "Up". On November 29, Bobby released the Japanese version of his debut solo album. He released his second studio album, Lucky Man, on January 25, 2021.

In March 2023, Bobby will release his solo single "S.i.R" on March 21. The single solo album will contain two new songs: "DROWNING" (title track) and "Cherry Blossom" (b-side track).

Personal life 
On August 20, 2021, Bobby announced in his Instagram post his upcoming wedding to his fiancée, who was expecting their first child in September. In September 2021, YG Entertainment announced that Bobby's fiancée had given birth to a son.

Discography

Studio albums

Collaborative albums

Singles

As lead artist

As featured artist

Other charted songs

Songwriting and production credits

Filmography

Awards and nominations

References

External links

1995 births
Living people
21st-century South Korean singers
IKon members
K-pop singers
Rappers from Seoul
South Korean hip hop record producers
Show Me the Money (South Korean TV series) contestants
South Korean male idols
South Korean male rappers
South Korean singer-songwriters
YG Entertainment artists
South Korean male singer-songwriters